Apama may refer to:

Nature
 Apama, a synonym of the flowering plant genus Thottea
 Sepia apama, a species of the Australian giant cuttlefish
 For the tree in South America, see Tabebuia rosea

People
Apama sometimes spelled Apame for a woman and Apammes for a man, is an ancient and modern name of Persian origin. The name can refer to: 
 Apama, daughter of the admirable Bartacus and concubine of King Darius I of Persia
 Apama, daughter of Artaxerxes II of Persia and wife of Pharnabazus
 Apama, sometimes known as Apama I or Apame I, first Queen of the Seleucid Empire
 Apama, daughter of Seleucus I Nicator and Apama I
 Apama II, a Seleucid Princess and one of the daughters of Antiochus I Soter and Stratonice of Syria
 Apama, one of the daughters of Antiochus II Theos and Laodice I
 Apama III, niece of Apama II, daughter of Demetrius II Aetolicus and Stratonice of Macedon
 Apama IV sometimes known as Apame IV, a princess whose father was Philip V of Macedon and brother was Perseus of Macedon
 Apama, daughter of Alexander of Megalopolis who married Amynander of Athamania
 Apama Popat, an Indian athlete who participated at the 2000 Sydney Olympics, see Great Britain at the 2000 Summer Olympics

Technology
 Apama Real-time Analytics, a Complex Event Processing product from Software AG

See also
 Apamea (disambiguation)
 Apame (disambiguation)